I Paralyze is the seventeenth studio album by American singer-actress Cher, released on May 28, 1982 by Columbia Records, her only album for the label. The album was a commercial failure and failed to chart. The album was promoted by the release of two singles, Rudy, and I Paralyze, both of which failed to chart. Following the record's release, Cher took a five-year hiatus from music to focus on her film career due to a lack of successful albums and singles. She made a comeback in 1987 when she released the Platinum-certified album Cher.

Album information 
Recorded and released in 1982, this was her only album for Columbia Records.  The record was produced by John Farrar (of Olivia Newton-John fame) and David Wolfert and it is her first collaboration with composer and producer Desmond Child.  The album was promoted only on American Bandstand and Solid Gold. It failed to chart and was largely ignored by critics.  The album was  released on CD for the first time in 1989 By "The Entertainment Company", Columbia Records and CBS Records International. Later, in 1999, the album was reissued on the Varèse Sarabande reissue label under license from Sony Music.

The album contains various musical styles: the rock style of Black Rose on cuts such as "Walk With Me", "The Book of Love", and "Rudy"; a slight new wave sound in "I Paralyze"; some ballads such as "When the Love is Gone" and "Do I Ever Cross Your Mind?"; and an "old 80's" style on "Back On the Street Again" (a retitled cover of The Babys' "Back on My Feet Again") and "Games", which was recorded by Lisa Hartman for her 1982 album Letterock and she performed it on the television series Knots Landing. "Rudy" and "I Paralyze" were released as singles to promote the album, but they were both unsuccessful. "Rudy" was originally recorded by French singer Dalida as "Quand je n'aime plus, je m'en vais". In 1981 Cher recorded a song with Meat Loaf called "Dead Ringer for Love"; the song was a hit in UK, but did not appear in the final cut of the album.

Track listing 
All tracks produced by David Wolfert except "I Paralyze" by John Farrar.

Personnel 

Cher – lead vocals
Jai Winding – arranger, keyboards
Rick Shlosser – drums
Steve Lukather, Sid McGinnis,  Carlos Rios, Thom Rotella – guitar
Ralph Schuckett – Hammond organ
Richard Crooks – percussion
Nathan East – synthesizer, bass guitar
David Wolfert – synthesizer, guitar, arranger, producer
Ed Walsh – synthesizer
Michael Boddicker - synthesizer, vocoder programming
John Farrar - guitar, backing vocals
Gary Herbig - saxophone
Steve George – background vocals
Tom Kelly – background vocals
Myrna Mathews – background vocals
Denise Maynelli DeCaro – background vocals
Marti McCall – background vocals
Richard Page – background vocals

Technical
Executive Producer: Charles Koppelman
Producer: John Farrar, David Wolfert
Reissue Producers: Cary E. Mansfield, Mike Khouri
Reissue Liner Notes: Mike Khouri
Engineers: Dennis Ferrante, John Arrias
Mixing: Lee Decarlo
Remixing: Dan Hersch
Mastering Supervisor, Tape Research: Bill Inglot
Art direction: Nancy Greenberg
Reissue Design: Matt B.
Photography: Harry Langdon

References

External links 

1982 albums
Cher albums
Albums produced by John Farrar